Edith Martin 'Edie' Rodgers (born 1934) is a former Republican member of the South Carolina Senate, representing the 124th District from 1997 until 2002.

References

South Carolina state senators
1934 births
Women state legislators in South Carolina
Living people
Women in the South Carolina State Senate